James Andrew Blount (December 29, 1884October 6, 1974) was an American lawyer and Democratic politician. He was a member of the Mississippi Senate from 1916 to 1917 and from 1944 to 1948. He also was a member of the Mississippi House of Representatives from 1948 to 1952.

Biography 
James Andrew Blount was born on December 29, 1884, in Williamsburg, Mississippi. He was the son of Thomas C. Blount. He graduated from Millsaps College in 1908 with PhD and B. S. degrees. From 1909 to 1910, he took a post-graduate course at the University of Mississippi.

He was the Superintendent of Schools in Charleston, Mississippi, for 3 years in the late 1900s (decade). He then went back to college to study law. He received a L. L. B. from Millsaps College in 1913.

Political career 
In November 1915, he was elected to represent Mississippi's 28th district in the Mississippi Senate as a Democrat for the 1916–1920 term. He served the term until 1917, when he went to fight in World War I. In the war, he was promoted to captain (he later retired from the U. S. Army as a Colonel). After the war, he was the Tallahatchie County prosecuting Attorney from 1928 to 1940. He then represented Mississippi's 27th district in the Mississippi Senate from 1944 to 1948. He represented Tallahatchie County in the Mississippi House of Representatives from 1948 to 1952.

Personal life 
Blount was married to Ethel Harvey; they had no children. Blount died on October 6, 1974, in the Tallahatchie County Hospital in Charleston, Mississippi.

References 

1884 births
1974 deaths
People from Charleston, Mississippi
Democratic Party Mississippi state senators
Democratic Party members of the Mississippi House of Representatives
United States Army colonels